34th New York Film Critics Circle Awards
January 26, 1969(announced December 30, 1968)

Best Picture: 
 The Lion in Winter 
The 34th New York Film Critics Circle Awards, honored the best filmmaking of 1967.

Winners
Best Actor:
Alan Arkin - The Heart Is a Lonely Hunter
Best Actress:
Joanne Woodward - Rachel, Rachel
Best Director:
Paul Newman - Rachel, Rachel
Best Film:
The Lion in Winter
Best Foreign Language Film:
War and Peace (Voyna i mir) • Soviet Union
Best Screenplay:
Lorenzo Semple Jr. - Pretty Poison
Special Award:
Yellow Submarine

References

External links
1968 Awards

1968
New York Film Critics Circle Awards, 1968
New York Film Critics Circle Awards
New York Film Critics Circle Awards
New York Film Critics Circle Awards
New York Film Critics Circle Awards